Florica is a commune in Buzău County, Muntenia, Romania. It is composed of a single village, Florica.

References

Communes in Buzău County
Localities in Muntenia